An Phú is a ward of Thuận An town in Bình Dương Province of Southeast region of Vietnam. An Phú is divided into 5 neighborhoods: 1A, 1B, 2, 3, 4. First Vietnam Singapore Industrial Park (VSIP) is located in An Phú near Bình Đáng of Bình Hòa ward.

References

Populated places in Bình Dương province